Viking is an unincorporated community located in the town of Gilman in Pierce County, Wisconsin and the town of Eau Galle in St. Croix County, Wisconsin, United States.

Notes

Unincorporated communities in Pierce County, Wisconsin
Unincorporated communities in St. Croix County, Wisconsin
Unincorporated communities in Wisconsin